Dejana Radanović was the defending champion, but lost in the second round to Ivana Jorović.

Vera Lapko won the title, defeating Anastasia Potapova in the final, 6–1, 6–3.

Seeds

Draw

Finals

Top half

Bottom half

References
Main Draw

O1 Properties Ladies Cup - Singles